Suzanne Krull (July 8, 1966 – July 27, 2013) was an American actress.

Early years 
Born in New York City, Krull attended South Shore High School in Brooklyn, New York, and Agoura High School in Agoura, California. She was a graduate of the American Academy of Dramatic Arts in New York City.

Death
Krull died on July 27, 2013, of a ruptured aortic aneurysm. She was interred at Mount Sinai Memorial Park Cemetery in Los Angeles on July 30, 2013.

Filmography

Film

Television

Shorts

References

External links

1966 births
2013 deaths
Actresses from New York City
American Academy of Dramatic Arts alumni
American film actresses
American television actresses
Burials at Mount Sinai Memorial Park Cemetery
Deaths from aortic aneurysm
People from Brooklyn
Place of death missing
21st-century American women